My Horse & Me 2 (Known in North America as My Horse & Me: Riding for Gold) is a horse racing video game developed by Tate Interactive and published by Atari Europe. It is the sequel to My Horse & Me.

References

External links
 Official web site

2008 video games
Horse-related video games
Xbox 360 games
Wii games
Windows games
Video games developed in Poland
PlayStation 2 games
Nintendo DS games